Harald Svergja (born 1964) is a Norwegian ski-orienteering competitor and world champion. He won a gold medal in the relay event at the World Ski Orienteering Championships in Val di Non in 1994, together with Kjetil Ulven, Lars Lystad and Vidar Benjaminsen.

He finished third in the overall World Cup in Ski Orienteering in 1993.

References

1964 births
Living people
People from Hedmark
Norwegian orienteers
Male orienteers
Ski-orienteers
Sportspeople from Innlandet
20th-century Norwegian people